Griffin inn  may refer to:

 Griffin Inn, a popular Pub name
 Griffin Inn, Nantwich, England, an 18th-century inn
 The Griffin, Widnes, England, now a Chef & Brewer pub, an 18th-century inn

See also
Fuller's Brewery#Griffin Brewery
 The Griffin, Monmouth, Wales, a public house